Motalafjella is a mountain range in Oscar II Land at Spitsbergen, Svalbard. It is located north of Eidembreen, between the glaciers of Austgötabreen and Vestgötabreen. Its highest peak reaches a height of 886 m.a.s.l. The mountain range is named after the Swedish city of Motala.

References

Mountain ranges of Spitsbergen